Giant cane is a common name for several plants and may refer to:

Arundinaria gigantea
Arundo donax